This article is about the 2019–20 American football season.

2019–20 College Football Playoff and Championship Game
 December 28, 2019: 2019 Cotton Bowl Classic in Arlington at AT&T Stadium
 The Penn State Nittany Lions defeated the Memphis Tigers 53–39.
 December 28, 2019: 2019 Fiesta Bowl in Glendale at State Farm Stadium
 The Clemson Tigers defeated the Ohio State Buckeyes 29–23.
 December 28, 2019: 2019 Peach Bowl in Atlanta at Mercedes-Benz Stadium
 The LSU Tigers defeated the Oklahoma Sooners 63–28.
 December 30, 2019: 2019 Orange Bowl in Miami Gardens at Hard Rock Stadium
 The Florida Gators defeated the Virginia Cavaliers 36–28.
 January 1: 2020 Rose Bowl in Pasadena at Rose Bowl
 The Oregon Ducks defeated the Wisconsin Badgers 28–27.
 January 1: 2020 Sugar Bowl in New Orleans at Mercedes-Benz Superdome
 The Georgia Bulldogs defeated the Baylor Bears 26–14.
 January 13: 2020 College Football Playoff National Championship in New Orleans at Mercedes-Benz Superdome
 The LSU Tigers defeated the Clemson Tigers 42–25.

National Football League
 January 26: 2020 Pro Bowl in Orlando
 February 2: Super Bowl LIV in Miami Gardens
Kansas City Chiefs defeated the San Francisco 49ers  31 - 20 
 April 23 – 25: 2020 NFL Draft in Paradise
 September 10, 2020 – January 3, 2021: 2020 NFL season

XFL
 February 8 – March 11: 2020 XFL season, terminated due to coronavirus pandemic and social distancing mandates

References

 
2020 sport-related lists